In topology, a branch of mathematics, a graph is a topological space which arises from a usual graph  by replacing vertices by points and each edge  by a copy of the unit interval , where  is identified with the point associated to  and  with the point associated to . That is, as topological spaces, graphs are exactly the simplicial 1-complexes and also exactly the one-dimensional CW complexes.

Thus, in particular, it bears the quotient topology of the set

under the quotient map used for gluing.

The topology on this space is called the graph topology.

Subgraphs and trees 

A subgraph  is called a tree if it is contractible as a topological space.

Properties 

 The associated topological space of a graph is connected (with respect to the graph topology) if and only if the original graph is connected.
 Forming the topological space associated to a graph as above amounts to a functor from the category of graphs to the category of topological spaces.
 Every covering space projecting to a graph is also a graph.

Applications 

Using the above properties of graphs, one can prove the Nielsen–Schreier theorem.

See also 
Graph homology
Topological graph theory

References 

Topological spaces